The 1989 ECAC Hockey Men's Ice Hockey Tournament was the 28th tournament in league history. It was played between March 3 and March 11, 1989. Quarterfinal games were played at home team campus sites, while the 'final four' games were played at the Boston Garden in Boston, Massachusetts. By winning the tournament, St. Lawrence received the ECAC's automatic bid to the 1989 NCAA Division I Men's Ice Hockey Tournament.

Format
The tournament featured three rounds of play. The four teams that finish below eighth place in the standings are not eligible for tournament play. In the quarterfinals the first seed and eighth seed, the second seed and seventh seed, the third seed and sixth seed and the fourth seed and fifth seed played a two-game series to determine the winner. In the two games no overtime was permitted and if the two teams remained tied after the two games then a 10-minute mini-game would be played where a sudden-death overtime was allowed if the scheduled time did not produce a victor. After the opening round every series becomes a single-elimination game. In the semifinals, the highest seed plays the lowest remaining seed while the two remaining teams play with the winners advancing to the championship game and the losers advancing to the third place game. The tournament champion receives an automatic bid to the 1989 NCAA Division I Men's Ice Hockey Tournament.

Conference standings
Note: GP = Games played; W = Wins; L = Losses; T = Ties; PTS = Points; GF = Goals For; GA = Goals Against

Bracket
Teams are reseeded after the first round

Note: * denotes overtime period(s)

Quarterfinals

(1) Harvard vs. (8) Rensselaer

(2) St. Lawrence vs. (7) Yale

(3) Colgate vs. (6) Vermont

(4) Clarkson vs. (5) Cornell

Semifinals

(1) Harvard vs. (6) Vermont

(2) St. Lawrence vs. (5) Cornell

Third Place

(1) Harvard vs. (5) Cornell

Championship

(2) St. Lawrence vs. (6) Vermont

Tournament awards

All-Tournament Team
F Lane MacDonald (Harvard)
F Ian Boyce (Vermont)
F Doug Murray* (St. Lawrence)
D Russ Mann (St. Lawrence)
D Mike Hurlbut (St. Lawrence)
G Paul Cohen (St. Lawrence)
* Most Outstanding Player(s)

References

External links
ECAC Hockey
1988–89 ECAC Hockey Standings
1988–89 NCAA Standings

ECAC Hockey Men's Ice Hockey Tournament
ECAC tournament